Xie Xiaofan (born 15 March 1998) is a Chinese footballer currently playing as a midfielder for Suzhou Dongwu.

Career statistics

Club
.

References

1998 births
Living people
Chinese footballers
Association football midfielders
China League Two players
Jiangsu F.C. players
Zibo Cuju F.C. players
Nantong Zhiyun F.C. players